Usnija Redžepova (4 February 1946 – 1 October 2015) was a Macedonian and former Yugoslav singer of Romani and Turkish origin. She was born in Skopje but spent much of her life in Belgrade where she died.

At the beginning of her career, she used Usnija Jašarova as a stage name in order not to be confused with Esma Redžepova, another Romani singer from Macedonia. The two did not have any family connection.

Usnija Redžepova started her singing career in the 1960s and released 15 singles and EPs and 9 albums. Her prolific repertoire mainly includes folk songs from Southern Serbia and Macedonia, sung in Serbian and in Romani, but also in Turkish.

Redžepova enjoyed through her career a large popularity in the whole Yugoslavia and its successor states. Apart from her songs, she is also known for her rendition of the leading role in Koštana, a Serbian play by Borisav Stanković. She performed it 150 times on stage at the National Theatre in Belgrade where she worked for 25 years.

Early life and background 
Usnija Redžepova was born on 4 February 1946 in Skopje, then in the People's Republic of Macedonia, part of the Federal People's Republic of Yugoslavia. Today the city of Skopje is the capital of North Macedonia. Her parents were both from ethnic minorities: her father Jašar was Romani and her mother Sabrina Turkish. Her father had already been married once, but as his wife could not have children, he remarried Usnija's mother. Sabrina already had two children from a previous marriage and she had four other children with Jašar, including Usnija. Both her parents were Muslims. At the start of her career, Usnija Redžepova put an emphasis on her Turkish heritage to minimise her Romani roots, although she never hid them as many Roma artists did at that time to avoid racism.

Redžepova's family was very poor, living in a slum, but Usnija remembered her childhood as happy. Her mother was strict and cold-tempered, but her father was joyful and caring. He was from the Džambaz community, known for its horse traders, but worked as a plumber. As a child, Usnija Redžepova was very shy, a personality trait she kept her all life. She soon discovered however that she enjoyed being on stage during folk performances. Around 1963, she took part in a karaoke contest organised by Radio Skopje. She sang and danced Ajde da igramo tvist ("Let's Dance Twist"), a pop song by Radmila Karaklajić. Her performance was acclaimed and officials from the radio station tried to convince her father to let her become a professional singer. At that time, singing was not considered as a reputable career in the Romani community, especially for women. Her father wanted his daughter to finish her secondary studies and become a good wife. Even after she had become famous, he would still be critical of the way his daughter dressed and acted on stage.

Music career

Debut 
Usnija Redžepova started performing soon after completing her secondary studies. Although she made come true her father's old dream to study Arabic at the University of Belgrade Faculty of Philology, she had to sing in cafés to get enough money to live. Most of her friends in Belgrade were from Macedonia and she met Nasko Džorlev, a Macedonian musician who had his own ensemble. She joined them and toured Yugoslavia for 5 years.

In 1966, she released her first disks, two EPs produced by Jugoton, one of the largest Yugoslav labels. As Esma Redžepova, another singer from Macedonia, had already signed with Jugoton, the label decided to rename the singer "Usnija Jašarova" to avoid any confusion. "Jašarova" was made up with the forename of Usnija's father, Jašar. The first EP was recorded in duet with another folk singer, Ivanka Jovanovska, while the second only contained songs by Usnija. The main title, Džulo, Džulo, quickly became a hit in Yugoslavia. The two disks were recorded in Serbian but the singer released a third EP in 1968 containing only Romani songs. Together with Vaska Ilieva and Anđelka Govedarović, two other folk singers, Usnija was sent to Australia in 1969 to perform for the Yugoslav diaspora. She also sang for the army in Croatia in 1971.

Koštana 
By 1973, Usnija Redžepova had experienced success and had started a promising career. However, she was still studying at the university and was feeling very tired. She had not realised that her success was exceptional and had an unassuming approach to it. That year, Žarko Jovanović, a prominent Serbian-Romani artist, wanted her to play in his new adaptation of Koštana, a popular play in Serbia telling the story of a Gypsy girl. As she had almost withdrawn from the scene, he was not able to find her until another Macedonian-Romani singer, Muharem Serbezovski, introduced Redžepova to him.

Although Redžepova was worried about having to play and sing in an academic setting, she joined the National Theatre in Belgrade to perform Koštana. She stayed there for 26 years until 1999. The play was a large success and Usnija Redžepova described her time there as euphoric. Although she had to give up her studies, she had the opportunity to visit some Arabic countries, including Sudan where she performed for Yugoslav workers. President Josip Broz Tito is said to have been an admirer and she performed for him and Fidel Castro when he was on a visit in the Brionian Islands. The cultural organisation responsible for her tours abroad, "Beogradska estrada", also permitted her to perform in Western countries. Throughout the 1970s, she released many singles and EPs, including some in Turkish. Her first album was released in 1977.

Later years 
After the breakup of Yugoslavia, Usnija Redžepova considered putting an end to her career because she was devastated by the death of her country. Nonetheless, she continued to release albums until 2007 but she ended up in a difficult financial situation after her husband's death in 2005. She received a national pension from the Serbian government on 29 December 2011.

Redžepova died on 1 October 2015 in Belgrade after a three-year long battle with lung cancer. She was 69. Her funeral took place at the Bajrakli Mosque in central Belgrade on 4 October and she was buried in Skopje at the Butel cemetery.

Personal life 
Usnija Redžepova met her husband, Svetomir Šešić aka Sele, in 1978 during a tour in Germany. They never had any children together. Sele was an accordionist and also one of the administrators of the prominent Serbian label PGP-RTB, which helped his wife in her career. He died in 2005 from pancreatic cancer.

Usnija Redžepova is not related to Esma Redžepova, another prominent Macedonian-Romani singer, but the two were close friends and released an album together in 1994, Songs of a Macedonian Gypsy, which gathers their main successes.

Discography

Albums 

 Usnija, PGP-RTB, 1977.
 Usnija, PGP-RTB, 1982.
 Dajte mi dajre, PGP-RTB, 1984.
 Šta hočeš, Jugoton, 1987.
 Usnija, PGP-RTB, 1988.
 Usnija i Orkestar Dragana Stojkovića Bosanca, PGP-RTB, 1992.
 Usnija, PGP-RTS, 1994.
 Ja sa juga, ti sa severa, PGP-RTS, 1998.
 Oko Niša kiša, Grand Production, 2007.

Extended plays 
  Usnija Jašarova i Jovanka Ivanovska, Jugoton, 1966.
 Džulo, Džulo, Jugoton, 1966.
 Ciganske pjesme pjeva Usnija, Jugoton, 1968.

Singles 

 Ne pitaj za moje ime, PGP-RTB, 1971.
 Da ima ljubov, da ima sreka, PGP-RTB, 1972.
 Hej cigani, PGP-RTB, 1974.
 Šta je život kad ljubavi nema, Suzy, 1975.
 Što me ostavi, Suzy, 1976.
 Kavusan sevgililer, PGP-RTB, 1976.
 Ne gledaj me, Suzy, 1976.
 Šta da radim sa tobom, PGP-RTB, 1978.
 Mani, Mani, PGP-RTB, 1978.
 Hočeš ljubav kćeri roma, PGP-RTB, 1979.
 Čaj ljelja rome, PGP-RTB, 1981.
 Kazuj, krčmo džerimo, PGP-RTB, 1983.

Compilations 
 Zbog tebe, Jugoton, 1982.
 Songs of a Macedonian Gypsy, Monitor Records, 1994.
 Romske pesme, PGP-RTS, 2002.
 O pesmo moja, Tioli, 2003.
 The Best Of, PGP-RTS, 2003.
 30 godina sa trubom, PGP-RTS, 2007.

Filmography 
 Death and the Dervish (Zdravko Velimirović, 1974), performing a singer.

See also
 Music of Serbia
 Romani music
 Esma Redžepova

References

1946 births
2015 deaths
20th-century Serbian women singers
Serbian Romani people
Musicians from Skopje
Serbian folk singers
Yugoslav women singers
Yugoslav Romani people
Romani singers
Macedonian people of Turkish descent
Deaths from lung cancer
Deaths from cancer in Serbia